Texan by Nature, originally formed in 2011 as Taking Care of Texas, is a 501(c)(3) nonprofit focusing on uniting business and conservation. Texan by Nature is headquartered at Austin, Texas.

History 
Texan by Nature was founded by former First Lady Laura Bush in 2011. Its stated mission is to, "align the broad interests of conservation groups with the resources of businesses, health care institutions, schools, the scientific community, and faith-based organizations [to] ... collectively create a positive impact for Texas’ economy, people, and land for generations to come".

Programs

Conservation Wrangler Program
Each year, Texan by Nature selects innovative projects from across Texas. These projects must be science based, with measurable outcomes and data.

2020 Conservation Wranglers 
Exploration Green Conservancy -

Respect Big Bend

Trinity Park Conservancy -  Trinity River Conservation Corps

Paso del Norte Trail

Texas Brigades

Texas Children in Nature

2019 Conservation Wranglers 

Certified Water Program

Trinity River Paddling Trail

Rio Grande Valley Reef Restoration

Oyster Shell Recycling Program

Grassland Restoration Incentive Program

Texas Prairie Wetlands Program

2018 Conservation Wranglers 
Building Conservation Trust – Oyster Reef Restoration

Building Conservation Trust (the National Habitat Program of Coastal Conservation Association) and Coastal Conservation Association Texas restored oyster habitat in Sabine Lake.

Constructed wetlands

Tarrant Regional Water District, Texas Parks and Wildlife Department, North Texas Municipal Water District, the John Bunker Sands Wetland Center, the Rosewood Corporation, and Alan Plummer Associates partnered to create over 4,000 acres of wetlands to showcase a sustainable approach for natural water filtration. The wetlands provide water supply to over 3.8 million people in the Dallas/Fort Worth area, and provide habitat for local wildlife.

Cool schools

Dallas Independent School District partnered with the Texas Trees Foundation to reduce urban heat at Dallas elementary schools. Eighty trees are planted per school with the goal to maintain a tree canopy cover, create outdoor learning environments, provide STEM-based curriculum, and to enhance experiential learning.

Dark Skies Initiative

Working with the Permian Basin Petroleum Association and the Texas Oil & Gas Association, McDonald Observatory of the University of Texas published a "Recommended Lighting Practices" guide. They have also partnered with the Apache Corporation to produce a video.

The practices reduce light pollution, have greater cost efficiency, and improve visibility and increase worker safety in the oil field.

El Carmen Land & Conservation Co.

El Carmen Land and Conservation Company, owned by CEMEX USA and Mr. Josiah Austin, is working on desert restoration and habitat enhancement in the Trans-Pecos.

Texas Playa Conservation Initiative

The Texas Playa Conservation Initiative is working to restore the playas in the Panhandle.

Partners for this project include Texas Parks and Wildlife, Playa Lakes Joint Venture, Natural Resources Conservation Service, US Fish and Wildlife Service, and Ducks Unlimited.

2017 Conservation Wranglers

Lake Livingston Friends of Reservoirs]

Lower Rio Grande Valley Learning Landscapes Collaborative

2014 Conservation Wranglers

Texas State Bison Herd

Texas Botanical Gardens and Native American Interpretive Center

Bracken Bat Cave

TxN Project Certification
The Texan by Nature Project Certification provides Texan employers, organizations, and individuals with recognition of their conservation efforts.

Symposia Series

South-Central Monarch Symposium

The South-Central Monarch Symposium took place May 31-June 1, 2017 at the Lady Bird Johnson Wildflower Center. Over 200 monarch conservation partners attended the event. Over 50 speakers presented their research, ranging from milkweed availability, distribution, and resources to private landowner perspectives.

The goals of the symposium included consolidating data on the monarch butterfly migration and identifying gaps in current scientific understanding and habitat management practices.

On July 18, 2018, Data and Project Manager Amy Snelgrove provided testimony of the findings from the symposium to the Texas House of Representatives' Committee on Culture Recreation & Tourism.

On August 10, 2018, the South-Central Monarch Conservation Community became live. This is a community to bring monarch researchers and conservation professionals together to recover the butterfly throughout Texas and Oklahoma.

Topics include:

 Communication & Outreach
 Funding
 Habitat Conservation
 Research
 Texas Monarch Consortium

A Natural Connection: Exploring Positive Outcomes in Health and Healing Through Nature

Texan by Nature co-hosted the symposium with Houston Methodist to discuss and identify gaps in the science between the mechanisms in nature that produce positive physiological and psychological health and healing benefits. Top researchers, physicians, and policymakers gathered to share their knowledge on the connections between health and nature and discussed their findings.

On May 2, 2018, a partnership between Texan by Nature, Houston Methodist Hospital, and Texas A&M University System was announced to form the Center for Health and Nature in Houston, Texas. Two research projects are currently being developed:

 Designing Systems to Prevent Physician & Nurse Burnout
 Heart Health and Nature

The Center for Health and Nature is planning for its 2019 Symposium for February 13, 2019.

Conservation Wrangler Summit 
Texan by Nature and Mrs. Bush hosted the first Conservation Wrangler Summit in 2018 to celebrate the best Conservation Wrangler projects. The now yearly event draws leaders from across Texas to share insights and efforts making impact in areas of conservation and sustainability.

Texan by Nature 20 (TxN20)
In 2019 Texan by Nature partnered with Texas Monthly to rank the top 20 companies in Texas working to push conservation forward.  Over 2,000 Texas-based companies were evaluated by a 14 point grading system resulting in the top 20 businesses committed to conservation efforts.

“The TxN 20 is an effort to recognize innovation and best practices in conservation coming from Texas-based businesses," Texan by Nature CEO and President, Joni Carswell.

TxN 20 2019 Honorees 

American Campus Communities 
Apache
Austin Convention Center
Cactus Feeders
CEMEX
Cirrus Logic
Comerica
Darling Ingredients
Dell
DFW Airport
Farmer Brothers
Harvest Seasonal Kitchen
H-E-B
King Land & Water
NRG Energy
Parkland Health & Hospital System
Phillips 66
Southwest Airlines
Texas Health Resources
Union Pacific

Deep in the Heart 
Texan by Nature is a primary sponsor of this wild life documentary that showcases Texas conservation and ecological issues through the eyes of wildlife. Deep in the Heart is a project led by Ben Masters of Fin and Fur Films.

Conservation Partners 
Description of Conservation Partners

List of Conservation Partners

 America's Wetland Foundation
 Armand Bayou Nature Center
 Audubon Texas
 Bat Conservation International
 Borderlands Research Institute/Sul Ross State University
 Botanical Research Institute of Texas
 Caesar Klegberg Wildlife Research Institute
 Cibolo Nature Center and Farm
 Coastal Conservation Association
 Dixon Water Foundation
 EarthX
 East Foundation
 Environmental Defense Fund
 Fort Worth Stock Show & Rodeo
 Galveston Bay Foundation
 Greater Edwards Aquifer Alliance
 Harte Research Institute/Texas A&M University Corpus Christi
 Headwaters at the Comal
 Hill County Alliance
 Hill Country Conservancy
 Houston Wilderness
 I-20 Wildlife Preserve
 John Bunker Sands Wetland Center
 Lady Bird Johnson Wildflower Center
 Land Trust Alliance
 Monarch Joint Venture
 National Butterfly Center
 National Fish and Wildlife Foundation
 National Ranching Heritage Center
 Native Plant Society of Texas
 Prescribed Burn Alliance of Texas
 San Antonio Botanical Garden
 Sand County Foundation
 South Texans' Property Rights Association
 South Texas Natives – CKWRI
 Texas A&M Natural Resources Institute
 Texas Agricultural Land Trust
 Texas AgriLife Extension Services
 Texas Bighorn Society 
 Texas Botanical Gardens and Native American Interpretive Center
 Texas Brigades
 Texas Children in Nature
 Texas Commission on Environmental Quality
 Texas Conservation Alliance
 Texas A&M Forest Service
 Texas Land Conservancy
 Texas Land Trust Council
 Texas Master Naturalist
 Texas Native Seeds – CKWRI 
 Texas Parks & Wildlife Department
 Texas Parks & Wildlife Foundation
 Texas Water Resources Institute
 Texas Wildlife Association
 The Frontera Land Alliance
 The Nature Conservancy
 The Witte Museum 
 Tom Lea Institute
 Trinity Park Conservancy 
 Trinity Waters
 U.S. Fish & Wildlife Service
 Wildlife Habitat Federation

Board Members 
2020

Laura Bush, Founder

Neal Wilkins, PH.D., Chairman

Cynthia Pickett-Stevenson, Vice Chairman

Tamara Trial, Secretary

Regan Gammon, Treasurer

Katharine Armstron

Marc Boom

Tina Buford

Joe Crafton

Ray Ingle

Elaine Magruder

Adair Margo

Carolyn Miller

Greg Schildwachter, PH.D.

Leadership 
In 2017 Joni Carswell was hired to lead Texan by Nature replacing interim director Matt Wagner.

Sources 

Nature conservation organizations based in the United States
Organizations based in Austin, Texas
2011 establishments in Texas
Environmental organizations based in Texas
Non-profit organizations based in Texas